Wanda Soprani (born March 9, 1940) is an Italian former artistic gymnast. She competed at the 1960 Summer Olympics.

References

1940 births
Living people
Italian female artistic gymnasts
Gymnasts at the 1960 Summer Olympics
Olympic gymnasts of Italy
People from Forlì
Sportspeople from the Province of Forlì-Cesena